Harold Atkinson (28 July 1925 – 4 September 2003) was an English footballer who played as a centre forward for Carlton, Tranmere Rovers and Chesterfield. He made 197 appearances for Tranmere, scoring 104 goals.

References

1925 births
2003 deaths
Footballers from Liverpool
Association football forwards
Tranmere Rovers F.C. players
Chesterfield F.C. players
Poole Town F.C. players
English Football League players
English footballers
Sportspeople from Bootle